Ana e Malit is a former municipality in the Shkodër County, in northwestern Albania. At the 2015 local government reform it became a subdivision of the municipality Shkodër. The population at the 2011 census was 3,858.

Settlements 
There are 11 settlements within Ana e Malit.
 Shtuf
 Muriqan
 Oblikë
 Oblikë e Sipërme
 Obot
 Dramosh
 Babot
 Vallas
 Velinaj
 Vidhgar

References

Sources
 Hecquard, Hyacinthe (1858). Histoire et description de la haute Albame ou Guégarie. A. Bertrand. pp. 25–26.

 
Administrative units of Shkodër
Former municipalities in Shkodër County